is a Japanese programming block on Fuji TV devoted to anime, originally broadcast every Thursday late night/Friday morning from 00:45 to 1:15. It was launched with the intention of expanding the target audience beyond the typical young male demographic. The block debuted in April 2005 as a half-hour block. All anime production under the block are joint-venue by Fuji TV, Dentsu and usually Sony Music Entertainment Japan or Aniplex.

The timeslot was expanded from half an hour to a full hour in 2010, and airs Thursday nights/Friday morning 00:45 to 1:45 but returned to half an hour timeslot in 2015 due to 5 noitaminA-produced films to be shown in Japanese theaters in the same year. So far the only non-anime series aired on noitaminA was the live-action adaptation of Moyashimon: Tales of Agriculture in 2010. 

On April 15, 2010, Fuji TV and Funimation announced an agreement that allows Funimation to simulcast series from the noitaminA block in North America within an hour of their airing in Japan. The deal was transferred to Aniplex of America after Funimation acquired in 2017 by Sony, the owner of Aniplex.

From 2016 to 2018, Fuji TV signed a deal with Amazon to exclusively stream and simulcast series from the noitaminA block through their Prime Instant Video service on March 17, 2016, starting with Kabaneri of the Iron Fortress, with The Promised Neverland being the first title since the deal to no longer be exclusive to Prime Video outside Japan.

Anime series

Films

See also
 Other Fuji TV anime blocks
 +Ultra, another anime block of Fuji TV that airs on Wednesday nights.
 Blue Lynx, Fuji TV's yaoi (boys' love) anime label
 Animeism, an anime block that airs on Friday nights on MBS.

Notes

References

External links 
 noitaminA website 
 Fuji Creative Corporation website 
 

 
Anime television
Fuji TV